The Weber House is a historic building located in Guttenberg, Iowa, United States.  It was built by Dr. Weber, a German immigrant surgeon, sometime before 1858.  It is also possible his name was George Wehmer.  Subsequently, the house was associated with the Freidlein and Zimmerman families who owned a nearby saw mill and lumber yard.  Initially, the 1½-story brick structure was in a "T" shape with a full size porch across the front.  The house has been added onto on the rear.  A two-frame kitchen wing had been added to the north side around 1900, and is no longer extant.  There was also a summer kitchen on the property at one time.  The building was listed on the National Register of Historic Places in 1984.

References

Houses in Guttenberg, Iowa
Houses on the National Register of Historic Places in Iowa
National Register of Historic Places in Clayton County, Iowa